Otto Martins Glória (9 January 1917 – 4 September 1986) was a Brazilian football coach.

Career
Glória was born in Rio de Janeiro, Brazil, but had his greatest successes with Benfica in Portugal, guiding the club to nine national trophies. With the Nigeria national team he won the 1980 African Cup of Nations.

In his first period with Benfica, the club was transformed to professional standards. Supported by president Joaquim Ferreira Bogalho, Glória founded a home for the players and focused on recruiting players from the periphery of the Portuguese capital and also from the African overseas provinces. In these years between 1954 and 1959 the club won two leagues and three Portuguese Cup.

In February 1962 he took on the reins of Olympique Marseille. The club was then stuck in the second division and saw its aspirations to return to the first division endangered. In his four months with the club he did not lose a single match and achieved its objective.

In his second tenure with Benfica he had continuous success on the national level, winning two more championships and cups. He also led the club into the 1968 final of the European Cup of Champions in London against Manchester United, which was lost 1–4.

At the 1966 FIFA World Cup in England he led the Portugal national team, with Eusébio, who became the tournament's top scorer, to the third place. In the process Portugal inflicted a 1–3 defeat on Glória's home country Brazil. The official head coach of the Portuguese team was then Manuel da Luz Afonso.

In 1979, he became with CR Vasco da Gama of Rio de Janeiro runner-up in the Brazilian championship, losing in the final 1–2 against SC Internacional Porto Alegre, which remained undefeated throughout the competition.

In the year thereafter he guided Nigeria through the 1980 African Nations Cup, which the team won in the final in Lagos with 3–0 against Algeria, and the Olympics in 1980 in Moscow. He left this position after poor performances at the 1982 campaign in Libya.

Glória coached Portugal, in 1982, in qualifying matches for UEFA Euro 1984, but resigned after a 0–4 defeat in a friendly match with Brazil, the following year.

Managerial honours

Club
Benfica
Primeira Liga: 1954–55, 1956–57, 1967–68, 1968–69
Taça de Portugal: 1954–55, 1956–57, 1968–69

Sporting CP
Primeira Liga: 1961–62, 1965–66

Belenenses
Taça de Portugal: 1959–60

Portuguesa
Campeonato Paulista: 1973

International
Portugal
FIFA World Cup: Third place 1966

Nigeria
African Nations Cup: 1980

References

External links

 

1917 births
1986 deaths
Sportspeople from Rio de Janeiro (city)
Brazilian football managers
CR Vasco da Gama managers
S.L. Benfica managers
C.F. Os Belenenses managers
Sporting CP managers
Olympique de Marseille managers
FC Porto managers
Portugal national football team managers
Atlético Madrid managers
Grêmio Foot-Ball Porto Alegrense managers
Associação Portuguesa de Desportos managers
Santos FC managers
C.F. Monterrey managers
Nigeria national football team managers
Campeonato Brasileiro Série A managers
Primeira Liga managers
Ligue 1 managers
La Liga managers
Liga MX managers
1966 FIFA World Cup managers
1980 African Cup of Nations managers
1982 African Cup of Nations managers
Brazilian expatriate football managers
Brazilian expatriate sportspeople in Portugal
Brazilian expatriate sportspeople in France
Brazilian expatriate sportspeople in Spain
Brazilian expatriate sportspeople in Mexico
Expatriate football managers in France
Expatriate football managers in Portugal
Expatriate football managers in Spain
Expatriate football managers in Mexico